The Stranger is an eight-part British mystery thriller miniseries written primarily by Danny Brocklehurst and based on the 2015 Harlan Coben novel of the same title. The miniseries premiered on Netflix on 30 January 2020. It stars Richard Armitage, Siobhan Finneran and Hannah John-Kamen. It was filmed in and around Manchester and Stockport.

Premise

A mysterious stranger, a woman in her 20s wearing a baseball cap, approaches Adam Price and tells him a secret. His wife goes missing as a result of the disclosure. As the story progresses, the stranger is revealed to be connected with more secrets.

Cast and characters

Main
 Richard Armitage as Adam Price, the husband of Corinne Price, and the father to Thomas and Ryan. Adam is the first person in the series to be approached by a mysterious woman with a baseball cap. She tells Adam a story about a pregnancy which his wife had faked, which turned out to be true. Corinne finds out what Adam has learned, and disappears mysteriously after she texts him that she needs some time for herself. As her mysterious disappearance is one of the central mysteries of the series, Adam's involvement with the stranger and his wife's disappearance become more prominent. 
 Siobhán Finneran as Detective Sergeant (DS) Johanna Griffin, who was originally assigned to a case involving the beheading of an alpaca. As the series progresses, she learns about the connection between the stranger and other cases that have involved her. As she later investigates, she takes on the case involving Corinne's mysterious disappearance as well as Heidi Doyle's murder. 
 Jennifer Saunders as Heidi Doyle, a woman who owns a cake shop. She finds out from the Stranger that her daughter was involved in prostitution. The Stranger threatens Heidi by demanding money or her daughter's secret will be exposed. Heidi is later approached by Patrick Katz who claims to be investigating her daughter's case, but turns out to be chasing the Stranger. Heidi's confrontation with Patrick results in her murder. Johanna Griffin takes on her case, and is emotionally distraught as Heidi was her friend. Heidi's murder becomes a secondary conflict in the series. 
 Shaun Dooley as Doug Tripp, Adam's longtime friend and neighbour, who has helped Corinne run the local boys' football club. Adam discovers Corinne called Doug shortly after Adam confronted her with the Stranger's accusations.
 Paul Kaye as Patrick Katz, a policeman who attempts to pursue the Stranger, even going as far as murdering Heidi Doyle, who had information about the Stranger. Patrick goes to great lengths to keep the investigators from discovering his involvement in Heidi's murder, as he collaborates with the police. 
 Dervla Kirwan as Corinne Price, wife of Adam Price, mother of Ryan and Thomas Price. Corinne had a secret that the Stranger told her husband. She had faked a pregnancy, which Adam had investigated further. This secret causes a devastating impact to the family and Corinne goes missing as a result. Corinne's disappearance becomes the central conflict of the series as Adam becomes more and more involved. It is later revealed that many other people's secrets were exposed by the Stranger. 
 Kadiff Kirwan as Detective Constable (DC) Wesley Ross, who assists Johanna Griffin with the investigation of the beheading of the alpaca and a nude teenage boy who is found near a lake.
 Jacob Dudman as Thomas Price, the elder son of Adam and Corrine Price, and older brother of Ryan Price. Thomas has a secret that he keeps through the course of the series. It involved his friends Daisy Hoy and Mike Tripp. All three of them try to cover up their involvement as the police further investigates. 
 Ella-Rae Smith as Daisy Hoy, Thomas' love interest who goes to school with him. Daisy had kept a secret after Thomas' friend, Mike had allegedly sent inappropriate pictures of Daisy's sister Ella causing Daisy to take matters in her own hands.
 Brandon Fellows as Mike Tripp, Thomas' friend who had done something wrong after a drug spike in his system, causing the police to investigate. He, along with Thomas and Daisy try to cover up their involvement. 
 Misha Handley as Ryan Price, younger son of Adam and Corinne Price, and the younger brother of Thomas Price. Thomas plays football near a club where his father, Adam, is approached by the Stranger. Ryan isn't aware of his mother's secret, but becomes involved with his brother and father after she goes missing. He tries to help his family find her but at the same time, he is distraught and traumatized with his mother's disappearance. 
 Anthony Head as Edgar Price, Adam's father, a womanizing property developer whose relationship with his son is fractured on both a personal and professional level.
 Hannah John-Kamen as The Stranger, a woman in her 20s who wears a baseball cap. She finds out other people's secrets, and threatens their family or close friends with revealing them in demand for money. As the series progresses, the woman takes a prominent part of the series. She is first seen talking to Adam in a football club and then goes around telling the characters in the series about what she knows. Adam attempts to learn more about the Stranger, along with DS Johanna Griffin. While looking for his wife, Adam searches for the Stranger to find out more about what she knows. More comes to light about the Stranger as the series progresses. 
 Stephen Rea as Martin Killane, a retired private detective who Adam Price is representing in a case to protect his house from demolition by a rapacious property developer.

Recurring
 Lily Loveless as Ingrid Prisby
 Kai Alexander as Dante Gunnarsson
 Callie Cooke as Kimberley Doyle
 Jade Harrison as Vicky Hoy
 Clinton Blake as Bob Baime
 Robert Ewens as Max Bonner
 Humera Syed as Olivia Katz
 Kim Vithana as Leila Katz
 Guy Oliver-Watts as Ian Doyle
 Don Gilet as Phillip Griffin
 Jemma Powell as Becca Tripp
 Chike Chan as Jason Yeong
 Sam Redford as Erik Gunnarsson
 India Brown as Ella Hoy, Daisy's younger sister. Daisy tries to seek revenge after inappropriate pictures of her sister were sent from her phone. The pictures were assumed to have been placed by Thomas' friend, Mike.
 Matthew Douglas as Larry Powers
 Aretha Ayeh as Suzanne Hope
 Joey Ansah as Stuart Hope
 Tamica Greenaway as DC Marisa Desford
 Ace Bhatti as Parth Kuhalam
 Yinka Awoni as  Peter Ince

Guest
 Camilla Arfwedson as Sally Prentice
 Ritu Arya as Michaela
 Pasha Bocarie as Dan Molino

Episodes

Production
It was announced in January 2019 that Netflix had begun development of a miniseries based on the 2015 Harlan Coben novel, with the adaptation being written by Danny Brocklehurst and with Richard Armitage set to star. By March, the cast was rounded out, with the additions including Siobhan Finneran, Hannah John-Kamen, Jennifer Saunders, Anthony Head and Stephen Rea.

Filming
Filming began in March 2019, taking place in Manchester. Scenes were shot in Bury and Bolton in April, and in Stockport in June.

Reception
The review aggregator website Rotten Tomatoes reported an 83% approval rating for the miniseries with an average rating of 6.63/10, based on 24 reviews. The website's critical consensus states, "If not quite as addicting [addictive] as its source material, The Stranger has a strong cast and enough tension to keep viewers on the edge of their seats." On Metacritic, it has a weighted average score of 62 out of 100, based on 5 critics, indicating "generally favorable reviews".

References

External links
 
 

2020 British television series debuts
2020 British television series endings
2020s British mystery television series
2020s British television miniseries
British thriller television series
English-language Netflix original programming
Television shows based on American novels
Television series by Red Production Company
Television series by StudioCanal
Television shows filmed in England